Annette Albertine Gerritsen (born 11 October 1985) is a Dutch former speed skater. She specialised in the 500 m and 1000 m distances, and won a silver medal in the 1000 metres at the 2010 Winter Olympics in Vancouver. She is the current Dutch junior record holder in the 500 m (38.57) and her personal best (1.16.14) used to be the world junior record. She also holds the world junior record with her Dutch teammates in the team pursuit (3.12.37).

Skating career
Gerritsen's breakthrough came during the 2004–05 speed skating season when she won the bronze medal in the 500 m at the 2005 KNSB Dutch Single Distance Championships. She won another bronze medal that same year at the 2005 KNSB Dutch Sprint Championships and qualified for the 2005 ISU World Sprint Championships where she finished in 17th position.

2005–06 season
The year after, at the 2006 KNSB Dutch Single Distance Championships she improved her bronze 500 m medal to a silver and was also able to win a bronze medal in the 1000 m. She then successfully defended her bronze medal at the 2006 KNSB Dutch Sprint Championships and also managed to qualify for both the 2006 ISU World Sprint Championships and the 2006 Winter Olympics. While her Sprint Championships were successful when she finished in 6th position her Olympics were disappointing. Gerritsen qualified in two distances. She finished 12th in the 500 m and 23rd in the 1000 m.

2006–07 season
In the 2006–07 pre-season Gerritsen showed her potential to become the fastest Dutch sprint speed skater when beating teammate Marianne Timmer several times. However at the 2007 KNSB Dutch Single Distance Championships she was unable to keep her pre-season form and only finished in third position behind the surprising Margot Boer and Timmer. Her performances gave her the opportunity to participate in the 2007 World Sprint Championships, where she finished 7th overall, with a 4th place in the second 1000 m race. On 28 January, Gerritsen won her first World Cup event, a 500 m in Heerenveen, although only after favorite Jenny Wolf fell after 50 m. Her victory guaranteed her a spot in the 500 m at the 2007 World Single Distance Championship, to be held in Salt Lake City on 10 March.

Gerritsen used to date multiple Olympic speed skating medallist Sven Kramer.

2010 Olympics
Gerritsen won silver in the 1000 m at the 2010 Winter Olympics in Vancouver with a time of 1.16.58, only a fiftieth of a second behind gold medallist Christine Nesbitt of Canada.

Personal bests

References

External links

 
 
 
 
 
 
 
  

1985 births
Dutch female speed skaters
Olympic speed skaters of the Netherlands
Speed skaters at the 2006 Winter Olympics
Speed skaters at the 2010 Winter Olympics
Olympic silver medalists for the Netherlands
Olympic medalists in speed skating
Medalists at the 2010 Winter Olympics
People from Waterland
Living people
World Single Distances Speed Skating Championships medalists
World Sprint Speed Skating Championships medalists
Sportspeople from North Holland
21st-century Dutch women